Standing is a human position in which the body is held upright.

Standing may also refer to:

Law and legal concepts
Standing (law)
Third-party standing

Other
Standing (surname)
Social standing

See also
Good standing
Standings, alternative name for a league table
Standing stone (disambiguation)